Eugène Lefèvre-Pontalis (12 February 1862 – 31 October 1923) was a French medievalist and archeologist.

Following his studies at the Lycée Condorcet, in 1881 he entered the École Nationale des Chartes, where he wrote a thesis on religious architecture in the former Diocese of Soissons in the 11th and 12th centuries. During his studies, he worked at the Mazarine Library and apprenticed with Alphonse Simil, an architect in the Commission des Monuments historiques.

In 1894, he became assistant in medieval archaeology at the École Nationale des Chartes. In 1911 he became the professor.

In 1911, he became president of the Société française d’archéologie and, in 1916, of the Société nationale des antiquaires. He founded the Société des amis de la cathédrale de Reims to help restore the Cathedral of Notre-Dame, Reims after World War I.

At his death, he gave his  photographs to the Société française d’archéologie.

1862 births
1923 deaths
Archaeologists from Paris
French medievalists
French photographers
Lycée Condorcet alumni
French male non-fiction writers
École Nationale des Chartes alumni